Stefan Öhman (born 5 May 1976) is a Swedish-Finnish hockey coach and former professional forward. He spent several years in the Finnish SM-liiga, playing for Tappara and Espoo Blues. He also played for Björklöven and Modo Hockey in the Swedish Elitserien and for IK Oskarshamn in the HockeyAllsvenskan.

Personal life 
Öhman received Finnish citizenship during his years in SM-liiga, and has children with his Finnish wife, Katja.

References

External links

1976 births
Living people
IF Björklöven players
Espoo Blues players
Finnish ice hockey centres
Modo Hockey players
IK Oskarshamn players
People from Örnsköldsvik Municipality
Swedish expatriate ice hockey players in Finland
Swedish ice hockey centres
Tappara players
Finnish people of Swedish descent
Naturalized citizens of Finland
Sportspeople from Västernorrland County